The Groceries Code Adjudicator (or Supermarket Ombudsman) is an independent statutory office responsible for enforcing the Groceries Supply Code of Practice and to regulate the relationship between supermarkets and their direct suppliers within the United Kingdom. The post was created by the Groceries Code Adjudicator Act 2013 and is an independent office within the Department for Business, Energy and Industrial Strategy.

The UK Competition Commission ( the Competition and Markets Authority (CMA) undertook an investigation of grocery retail in 2009, and recommended that government establish an ombudsman for the sector. The Groceries Supply Code of Practice applied initially to ten retailers with an annual turnover of £1bn+, namely Tesco, Co-op, Sainsbury’s, Marks and Spencer, Asda, Lidl, Morrisons, Aldi, Waitrose, and Iceland. On 9 February 2022, the CMA announced that Amazon.com would also be included with effect from 1 March 2022.

Trade magazine and website Retail Week reported that in response to calls for submissions to the Competition Commission investigation, major UK retailer Aldi supported the establishment of a retail ombudsman, while Tesco, Sainsbury's, and a number of other major retailers did not support its establishment.

In January 2013 Christine Tacon was appointed to the role for a four-year period. Her first investigation was into the supply chain activities of Tesco plc.

The adjudicator publishes interpretative guidance on the Code of Practice, best practice statements and details of retailers' voluntary commitments and arbitrates in disputes between retailers and suppliers.

References

External links
 Groceries Code Adjudicator website
Groceries Code Adjudicator Act 2013

2013 establishments in the United Kingdom
Public bodies and task forces of the United Kingdom government
Department for Business, Energy and Industrial Strategy
Supermarkets of the United Kingdom
Ombudsman posts
Ombudsmen in the United Kingdom